Vagn Høgholm (born 24 September 1965) is a Danish swimmer. He competed in the men's 50 metre freestyle and men's 4 × 100 metre freestyle relay events at the 1988 Summer Olympics.

References

External links
 

1965 births
Living people
Danish male freestyle swimmers
Olympic swimmers of Denmark
Swimmers at the 1988 Summer Olympics
Swimmers from Copenhagen